Kommissionen, (in English: The Commission) is a 2005 Swedish TV series airing over 12 episodes.

The series, set in and around Stockholm, deals with the effects and political aftermath of a terrorist attack that destroys Rosenbad, the Ministry for Foreign Affairs and much of the Riksdag building.

Kommissionen was shot in 2004 and was scheduled for airing on SVT in the spring of 2005, but it was postponed until the autumn. When aired on television, it was simultaneously released on DVD and as a book.

Selected cast

 Katarina Ewerlöf - Lena Lagerfeldt,
 Loa Falkman - Rolf G. Johansson, Prime Minister of Sweden
 Chatarina Larsson - Grete Ancker
 Helge Skoog - Sigvard Borg
 Göran Gillinger - Nils Folkesson
 Peter Perski - Karim Mahmoudi
 Cecilia Häll - Unni Hoffner
 Anna Ulrika Ericsson - Anne Petersson
 Thomas Hedengran - Yngwe

External links
 
 SVT - show page

Sveriges Television original programming
Swedish drama television series